Paul Young (born 8 January 1973, in Swansea) is a Welsh international rugby union player. A hooker, he attained his only international cap as a replacement against Romania on 27 August 2003.

Young made 16 appearances for the Welsh regional team Newport Gwent Dragons. He previously played for Llanelli RFC, Cardiff RFC and Newport RFC., Beautiful Man,

References

External links
Newport Gwent Dragons profile

Wales international rugby union players
Rugby union players from Swansea
Dragons RFC players
Newport RFC players
Cardiff RFC players
Llanelli RFC players
Living people
1983 births
Rugby union hookers